Small Middle School may refer to:

Clint Small, Jr. Middle School in Austin, Texas, United States
Raymond Jordan-Small Middle School in Windham, Maine, United States
Robert Smalls Middle School in Beaufort, South Carolina, United States